Hexanitrostilbene (HNS), also called JD-X, is an organic compound with the formula [(O2N)3C6H2CH]2.  It is a yellow-orange solid. It is used as a heat-resistant high explosive.  It is slightly soluble (0.1 - 5 g/100 mL) in butyrolactone, DMF, DMSO, and N-methylpyrrolidone.

Production and use
It is produced by oxidizing trinitrotoluene (TNT) with a solution of sodium hypochlorite. HNS boasts a higher insensitivity to heat than TNT, and like TNT it is insensitive to impact. When casting TNT, HNS is added at 0.5% to form erratic micro-crystals within the TNT, which prevent cracking.  Because of its insensitivity but high explosive properties, HNS is used in space missions.  It was the main explosive fill in the seismic source generating mortar ammunition canisters used as part of the Apollo Lunar Active Seismic Experiments.

Its heat of detonation is 4 kJ/g.

It was developed by Kathryn Grove Shipp at the U.S. Naval Ordnance Laboratory in the 1960s and has been improved on since then.

See also

 TNT equivalent
 RE factor

References

Explosive chemicals
Nitrobenzenes
Stilbenoids